Bob Bayer is a retired American football coach and player.  He was the head coach at St. John Fisher College from 1975 to 1986.

Head coaching record

References

Year of birth missing (living people)
Living people
St. John Fisher Cardinals football coaches